The Porta Maggiore Basilica is an underground basilica discovered in 1917 near Porta Maggiore in Rome. It is dated to the first century BC.  It is believed to have been the meeting place of the neo-Pythagoreans, and is the only historical site that has been associated with the neo-Pythagorean movement. This school of mystical Hellenistic philosophy preached asceticism and was based on the works of Pythagoras and Plato.  It was a precursor to the basilicas built during the Christian period, centuries later. It was opened to small groups of visitors in April 2015.

Discovery
The underground chamber was discovered accidentally in 1917 during the construction of a railway line from Rome to Cassino. An underground passage  caved in, revealing the hidden chamber.

History
The structure is thought to have been constructed by the Statilius family. The then head of the family, Titus Statilius Taurus, was accused by the Senate for what Tacitus in his Annals called "addiction to magical superstitions". He protested his innocence but eventually committed suicide in CE53.

Architecture

The basilica has three naves lined by six rock pillars and an apse. They are decorated with stucco images of centaurs, griffins and satyrs. Classical heroes such as Achilles, Orpheus, Paris and Hercules are also represented.

Originally the basilica was entered through a long downhill entrance from the Prenestina Street, and through a vestibule.

Opening
The basilica underwent several years of restoration work. In 1951, a concrete shell was constructed that enclosed the entire basilica. Air purifiers from IQAir in Switzerland have been installed to combat radon gas.

The 40ft-long basilica is now opened to visitors. The visiting groups are kept small because of the fragility of the monument. The temperature and humidity must be kept within a narrow range. It is open during 2nd and 4th Sunday of every month, and the tour must be prearranged.

References

External links 
  La Basilica sotterranea di Porta Maggiore, Video, Adnkronos, Apr 24, 2015
Information on the Porta Prenestina from the LacusCurtius website.
 Pictures of the gate
 Porta Maggiore information  
 Further information, and a map 

Ancient basilicas in Rome
1917 archaeological discoveries
Buildings and structures completed in the 1st century BC
 
Subterranean buildings and structures